Shurron Pierson (born May 31, 1982) is a former American football linebacker and defensive end of the National Football League. He was originally drafted by the Oakland Raiders in the fourth round of the 2003 NFL Draft. He also played for the Chicago Bears. He played college football at South Florida.

References

1982 births
Living people
People from Inverness, Florida
American football defensive ends
American football linebackers
South Florida Bulls football players
Oakland Raiders players
Chicago Bears players